Gobindopur is a village in the Tinsukia district of Assam state in India.

References

Villages in Tinsukia district